Alexander Telalim (born 1966) is a Ukrainian and Bulgarian visual artist.  He graduated from the Grekov Odessa Art school, Odessa, Ukraine, and then from the National Academy of Arts, Sofia, Bulgaria. He currently lives and works in Sofia.

Alexander Telalim is one of the Bulgarian artists working predominantly in watercolour. He organically combines the natural fluidity of watercolour with the power of sharp lines, creating amazingly vivid and emotional works. His paintings harmonize visions of childhood with his philosophy. The conciseness of his medium highlights the depth and expressiveness of his watercolours in the heritage of Zen philosophy. Telalim also works as a calligrapher and book illustrator.

He is a member of the Union of Bulgarian Artists and has had more than 60 solo exhibitions in Europe, USA and Japan.

Alexander Telalim's artworks can be found in numerous private collections in Europe and US, as well as public collections of the City Gallery of Izmail (Ukraine), the Municipality of Saint Louis (France), the Bulgarian Consulate in New York City (US), the Municipality of Weimar (Germany) and the Ukrainian Consulate in Sofia (Bulgaria).

Career

2009   "Watercolor Dreamscapes" workshop, Illinois Institute of Art-Chicago, IL 
2004-07   Design line for the FPI hotels, Sofia and Varna, Bulgaria 
2004   International watercolor workshop, Nova Zagora, Bulgaria 
2003   Mural "The Magic Theater", The National Academy of Theater and Film, Sofia 
2002   International ceramic workshop, Troyan, Bulgaria

Selected group exhibitions

2013 "Summer Fusion", Collection Red showcases the talents of artists from the former Soviet Union, Kensington, London
2011 "The FIRST FLIGHT" exhibition by contemporary Bulgarian artists, Sofia Gallery, London
         "TRADITIONS AND INSPIRATIONS FROM THE EAST" - calligraphy of A. Telalim, bonsai and ikebana, Mission Gallery of the Ministry of Foreign Affairs in Sofia.
2010 "THE LIGHT OF THE WINTER STAR" (with Vassilen Vasevski), Ukrainian National Museum, Chicago, IL
2009   "BELLE MISTIQUE", Gallerie MK, River Nord Art District, Chicago 
          "FACES WITHOUT TRANSLATION", Noe Art Gallery, Sofia, Bulgaria 
2007   "TRACE OF WATER", Bulgarian Consulate in New York, (Bulgarian Days Festival), New York, NY 
2004   AROUND THE COYOTTE Art Festival, Chicago, IL 
          "FAR FROM YESTERDAY: NEW BULGARIAN ART" — TZ Gallery, Chicago, IL 
2002   "SAILS" (installation with Valia Telalim), "Sea of Forms" Art Festival, Golden Sands, Varna, Bulgaria 
2000   "SPIRITUAL MESSAGES", Vitosha Gallery, Sofia, Bulgaria 
1999   National exhibition "BULGARIA — DRAWING '99", Sofia, Bulgaria 
1997   National exhibition "BULGARIA — DRAWING '97", Sofia, Bulgaria 
1983-95   Group shows in Izmail and Odessa, Ukraine

Selected solo exhibitions

2010   "MORNING IN THE PROMISED LAND", Rosh Pinna, Israel 
2009   "WATERCOLORS", Ukrainian National Museum, Chicago, IL
           "THE HOME", Papillon Gallery, Varna, Bulgaria 
2008   "THE FLOWERS", Papillon Gallery, Varna, Bulgaria 
           "AQUARELLE", Girafe Gallery, Brussels, Belgium 
           "EDEM: AT HOME, TOWARDS THE INNER SELF", Lik Gallery, Sofia, Bulgaria 
           "DREAMS ON THE ROOF", Sofia Philharmonics Gallery, Sofia, Bulgaria 
2007   "AWAKE AND DREAMING" — Grita Gallery, Sofia, Bulgaria 
           "AQUA INCOGNITA", Girafe Gallery, Berlin, Germany 
           "AQUA INCOGNITA", Literaturehause Gallery, Weimar, Germany 
           "NEW MITHOLOGY", Noe Gallery, Sofia 
2006   "Balkanica" Cultural and Art Center, Sofia, Bulgaria 
           "YELLOW and BLUE" (Ukrainian Days in Macedonia), National Art Gallery, Skopje, Macedonia 
2002   "GIFT FOR LOVERS — 14.02", Galeros Gallery, Sofia, Bulgaria 
           "WATERCOLOR FROM BULGARIA", Olivian Gallery, Kagava, Japan 
           "FISHING AT NIGHT", Contemporary Art Center, Varna, Bulgaria 
2001   "MESSAGE FROM THE WEST" — Sachie Ikeda Gallery, Kagava, Japan 
           "Ludwig Beier" Exhibition Hall, Stara Zagora, Bulgaria 
2000   "BRIDGES" — "Bulgaria — Slavonic World" Museum, Sofia, Bulgaria 
         	City Art Gallery, Lodz, Poland 
1999   Gavrilova Gallery, Saint-Louis/Basil, France 
          "THE SKY", Santa Clara Monastery, Moguer, Spain 
           "THE WAY OF THE WIND", "Festinvest" Exhibition Hall, Sofia, Bulgaria 
          Garduno Gallery, Sevilla, Spain; City Gallery, Masagon, Spain 
1997   "WATER REFLECTIONS", City Art Gallery, Izmail, Ukraine 
           "MESSAGE FROM THE EAST", "Cristina de Vicente" Gallery, Huelva, Spain 
           "Valentina" Ukrainian Art Club, Sofia, Bulgaria

External links
 Oil Painting and Watercolor by Alexander Telalim & Vassi Vasevski in Ukrainian National Museum in Chicago. December 3-26, 2010. Ukrainian TV
 The "Watercolors" by Alexander Telalim in UNM. Ukrainian TV
 Художникът Александър Телалим - между портрета и пейзажа (Painter Alexander Telalim: Between portrait and landscape). (National Bulgarian TV SKAT, on Bulgarian)
 Матеус Пасион - разкаяние, изкупление, единение... (Matthew Passion - remorse, redemption, unity) (National Bulgarian TV SKAT, on Bulgarian)
 Exhibition "Aqua Incognita" by famous watercolourist Alexander Telalim. The exhibition will also present P.Chakir, A.Kraynyukov, M.Gataulina, I.Shishman (shooting IzmailTV, Ukraine)
 Watercolours of Alexander Telalim from Bulgarian TV+ (On Bulgarian)
 "Срещи с вас" и "Радиоавтограф" (interview on Bulgarian National Radio, on Bulgarian)
 "Van Gogh vs. madness" - Alexander Telalim in dialogue with great artics (interview on Bulgarian National Radio, on Bulgarian)
 
 Bulgarian Art at the Ukrainian Museum in Chicago (on Bulgarian)
 EXHIBITION OF ALEXANDER Telalim in Ukrainian NATIONAL MUSEUM OF CHICAGO (on Bulgarian)
 Water-Colour by Art Exhibit by Artist Alexander Telalim (Chicago Art Galleries), USA
 AlphaArt Gallery (New Brunswick, NJ, USA)
 Noe Gallery (Bulgaria)
 Tea Alba Gallery (Bulgaria)
 Masters of Watercolor. Saint Petersburg, 20-31 January, 2015
 ArtNow Gallery (Russia)
 Щастлив съм, когато подарявам красота и радост (interview on Information Agency Focus-News, Bulgaria) (Bulgarian)
 Interview of Vanya Koleva on Publishing House LITERNET, Bulgaria (Bulgarian)
 Paintings 
  (Russian)
  (Russian)
  (Russian)
 ] (Russian)
 Izmail will come well-known artist (Russian)
 Alexander Telalim and Krasimir Raikov gathered 50 art connoisseurs in Dupnitsa "Jamia" with his exhibition "Flowers and bells" family. (Bulgarian)
 Alexander Telalim present 42 works (Bulgarian)
 The beauty of simple things (Bulgarian)

References

 Masters of Watercolor. Exhibition participants catalogue "Masters of Watercolor. 2015" Saint Petersburg, 20–31 January 2015

1966 births
Artist authors
Bulgarian painters
Bulgarian watercolor painters
Living people
Ukrainian watercolourists
Ukrainian emigrants to Bulgaria